A row galley was a term used by the early United States Navy for an armed watercraft that used oars rather than sails as a means of propulsion. During the age of sail row galleys had the advantage of propulsion while ships of sail might be stopped or running at slow speed because of lack of wind for their sails. While called galleys, they were based on different hull type than the Mediterranean galley, the term being used mainly due to the employment of oars.

Row galleys were often fitted with sails in addition to the oars.

During the American Civil War, Union Navy and Confederate Navy ships operating in rivers and other interior waterways, would send row galleys to surprise and capture enemy ships anchored for the night.

References

Ship types